The Emeryville Marina is a marina in   Emeryville, California. It is the location of the Emeryville Ferry Terminal. The San Francisco Bay Trail runs through the marina. The marina has a public park.

References

 Emeryville, California
Geography of Alameda County, California